Toby Bedford (born 27 May 2000) is an Australian rules footballer playing for the Greater Western Sydney Giants in the Australian Football League (AFL), having initially been drafted to  in the 2018 AFL draft. A small forward, he made his AFL debut in the opening round of the 2020 season.

Junior career 
During his junior career, Bedford played for the Dandenong Stingrays in the TAC Cup and was part of Melbourne's Next Generation Academy, which allowed Melbourne to match any other club's bid on Bedford during a draft. He also represented Vic Country at the 2018 AFL Under 18 Championships. He also played for his school side Melbourne Grammar School in the APS competition. Bedford's strong performance in a TAC Cup preliminary final victory over the Sandringham Dragons, in which he amassed three goals, six tackles and 13 disposals, was highlighted by Fox Sports and ESPN. His speed and tackling were noted as strengths; ESPN likened his play to West Coast defender Lewis Jetta. Bedford was expected to attract a second-round bid in the upcoming 2018 AFL draft.

AFL career 
Bedford was drafted by Melbourne as an academy selection with pick 75 in the 2018 draft. He spent his first year at the club playing for Casey, Melbourne's Victorian Football League (VFL) affiliate; he played 21 matches in 2019. He made his AFL debut in the opening round of the 2020 season.

Statistics
Updated to the end of the 2022 season.

|-
| 2020 ||  || 12
| 2 || 0 || 1 || 6 || 10 || 16 || 3 || 4 || 0.0 || 0.5 || 3.0 || 5.0 || 8.0 || 1.5 || 2.0
|-
| 2021 ||  || 12
| 0 || – || – || – || – || – || – || – || – || – || – || – || – || – || –
|-
| 2022# ||  || 12
| 16 || 9 || 3 || 33 || 32 || 65 || 13 || 21 || 0.6 || 0.2 || 2.1 || 2.0 || 4.1 || 0.8 || 1.3
|- class=sortbottom
! colspan=3 | Career
! 18 !! 9 !! 4 !! 39 !! 42 !! 81 !! 16 !! 25 !! 0.5 !! 0.2 !! 2.2 !! 2.3 !! 4.5 !! 0.9 !! 1.4
|}

Notes

Personal life 
An Indigenous Australian, Bedford is a cousin of fellow Melbourne footballer Krstel Petrevski, who plays in the AFL Women's.

References

External links 

Living people
2000 births
Indigenous Australian players of Australian rules football
Australian rules footballers from Victoria (Australia)
Dandenong Stingrays players
Melbourne Football Club players
Casey Demons players